Kimberly Vandenberg (born December 13, 1983) is an American competition swimmer and Olympic medalist.

Vandenberg grew up in Moraga, California, and swam for Campolindo High School and Orinda Aquatics. She was a member of the bronze medal-winning U.S. team in the women's 4×200-meter freestyle relay at the 2008 Summer Olympics in Beijing, swimming in the preliminary heats of the relay event. She also won silver medals at the 2005 World University Games, and at the 2007 World Swimming Championships in the women's 200-meter butterfly. Four years later, she won a gold medal in the same event at the 2011 Pan American Games in Guadalajara.

Vandenberg attended University of California, Los Angeles (UCLA) and swam for the UCLA Bruins women's swimming and diving team. She graduated from UCLA in 2007.  Being one of the only U.S. Olympic swimmers to choose to train abroad, she returned to Brooklyn, in 2013 and trains with the New York Athletic Club, under head coach Romain Barnier, a former Olympian. "We have a really interesting group of international swimmers who have different experiences and who all learn from each other.  It's a unique experience", said Vandenberg in an interview with Gary Hall, Sr.

Vandenberg saw the benefits of training abroad and viewing the world's different training methods.

Vandenberg is an ambassador for Room to Read, an organization that focuses on literacy and gender equality in education, and for Up2Us Sports.

See also
 List of Olympic medalists in swimming (women)
 List of University of California, Los Angeles people
 List of World Aquatics Championships medalists in swimming (women)

References

External links

 
 
 
 
 

1983 births
Living people
American people of Dutch descent
American female butterfly swimmers
American female freestyle swimmers
Medalists at the 2008 Summer Olympics
Olympic bronze medalists for the United States in swimming
Pan American Games gold medalists for the United States
Swimmers from Berkeley, California
Swimmers at the 2008 Summer Olympics
Swimmers at the 2011 Pan American Games
UCLA Bruins women's swimmers
World Aquatics Championships medalists in swimming
People from Moraga, California
Pan American Games medalists in swimming
Universiade medalists in swimming
Universiade silver medalists for the United States
Medalists at the 2005 Summer Universiade
Medalists at the 2011 Pan American Games
21st-century American women